Fatehpur  is a town and Union Council of Kasur District in the Punjab Pakistan. It is a part of Kasur Tehsil and is located at 31°1'14N 74°19'53E with an altitude of 173 metres (570 feet).

Location

References

Kasur District